The 1890 Colgate football team represented Colgate University in the 1890 college football season.

Schedule

References

Colgate
Colgate Raiders football seasons
Colgate football